In algebraic geometry, the Behrend function of a scheme X, introduced by Kai Behrend, is a constructible function

such that if X is a quasi-projective proper moduli scheme carrying a symmetric obstruction theory, then the weighted Euler characteristic

is the degree of the virtual fundamental class

of X, which is an element of the zeroth Chow group of X. Modulo some solvable technical difficulties (e.g., what is the Chow group of a stack?), the definition extends to moduli stacks such as the moduli stack of stable sheaves (the Donaldson–Thomas theory) or that of stable maps (the Gromov–Witten theory).

References 
.

Geometry